Slade Bolden (born January 26, 1999) is an American football wide receiver who is a free agent. He played college football at Alabama and was signed by the Baltimore Ravens as an undrafted free agent in 2022.

Early life and high school
Bolden grew up in West Monroe, Louisiana and attended West Monroe High School, where he played baseball and football.  He played quarterback and receiver during his junior year and rushed for 1,370 yards and 24 touchdowns with 906 passing yards and nine touchdown passes while also catching 15 passes for 248 yards and four touchdowns. As a senior, Bolden passed for 1,622 yards and 20 touchdowns and rushed for 1,460 yards and 20 touchdowns and was named the Louisiana Gatorade Player of the Year. He was rated a three-star recruit and committed to play college football at Alabama over offers from TCU and LSU.

College career
Bolden played in Alabama's 2018 season opener against Louisville as a true freshman before opting to redshirt the year. As a redshirt freshman in the 2019 season, he caught two passes for 34 yards and rushed four times for 10 yards as a wildcat quarterback while also completing a six yard pass for a touchdown, which came against Tennessee. As a redshirt sophomore, Bolden became a starter at wide receiver after Jaylen Waddle suffered a broken ankle. Bolden caught a five-yard pass from Mac Jones in the 2021 College Football Playoff National Championship for his first career touchdown reception as the Crimson Tide won 52–24 over Ohio State. He finished the season with 24 receptions for 270 yards and one touchdown and returned seven punts for 29 yards. As a redshirt junior, Bolden caught 42 passes for 408 yards and three touchdowns. In the College Football Playoff Semifinal at the Cotton Bowl, he had a receiving touchdown against Cincinnati. After the season, Bolden announced that he would forgo his final year of eligibility and enter the 2022 NFL Draft.

Collegiate statistics

Professional career

Bolden signed with the Baltimore Ravens as an undrafted free agent on April 30, 2022. He was waived/injured on August 23, and placed on injured reserve. He was released on October 18, 2022.

References

External links
Collegiate statistics at Sports-Reference.com
Baltimore Ravens bio
Alabama Crimson Tide bio

1999 births
Living people
People from West Monroe, Louisiana
Players of American football from Louisiana
American football wide receivers
Alabama Crimson Tide football players
Baltimore Ravens players